Herbert Arthur "Bon" Thomas (21 November 1911 – 2 November 1995) was an Australian politician.

He was born the son of a farmer's in Walla Walla, and was a farm worker while young. In 1945 he settled at Deer Park, where he ran a milk bar before becoming a taxi proprietor from 1951. He was active in the peace movement, attending the World Peace Conference in Stockholm and an anti-H bomb conference at Tokyo in 1958. From 1960 to 1976 he was a Sunshine City Councillor, serving as mayor from 1967 to 1968 and from 1969 to 1970. In 1970 he was elected to the Victorian Legislative Council for Melbourne West as a Labor member. He served until his retirement in 1982, and died in 1995.

References

1911 births
1995 deaths
Australian Labor Party members of the Parliament of Victoria
Members of the Victorian Legislative Council
Victoria (Australia) local councillors
20th-century Australian politicians